Bhangagarh is a locality in Guwahati, Assam, India. It is surrounded by the localities of Paltan Bazaar, Chandmari and Ganeshguri. The nearest airport at Borjhar and the nearest railway station is that of Guwahati at Paltan Bazaar.

Health facilities
Various government and private hospitals are located here like Gauhati Medical College and Hospital, Regional Dental College and Hospital , Nemcare Hospital to name a few.

See also
 Basistha
 Bhetapara
 Beltola
 Jalukbari

References

Neighbourhoods in Guwahati